Rouse Hill Anglican College, is an independent, co-educational, day school, located in Rouse Hill, New South Wales, Australia.

The school is non-selective and currently caters for approximately 1,400 students from Pre-Kindergarten to Year 12.

History 

The College commenced in July 2000 with a small class of Kindergarten students based at Arndell Anglican College in Oakville.

Plans for the College commenced in the late 1990s. The north-west growth corridor was targeted by the Sydney Anglican Schools Corporation as a suitable location for a new low-fee Anglican school. Rapid and sustainable population growth in the area were the factors that led to the decision to establish a school at Rouse Hill.

The design of the original buildings and site was conducted by the architectural firm of Noel Bell Ridley Smith. The original concept was the responsibility of Mr Ridley Smith and the detail and oversight of the early building projects had been the responsibility of Mr Craig Stephen.

A number of sites were considered for the College, on both sides of Windsor Road, with a very significant variation in price. The site chosen was the only available location on the southern side of Windsor Road that had access to town water and sewerage services. This was a very significant provision. The site also boasted a good number of well-established trees and even includes a pocket of the Cumberland Plain Forest.

The appointment of the Foundation Principal, Mr Peter Fowler, took place in August 2001. At this time, enrolments and staff appointments were able to take place for the commencement of the College on site in February 2002.

Since opening the College has seen steady growth in building development, enrolments, academic achievement, diversity, and community.

Today the College’s physical environment consists well equipped and up to date specialist rooms, age-specific libraries, a gymnasium/auditorium, dedicated study areas, two ovals, hardcourts, and a beach volleyball court.  

The College has a 20-year development master plan to prepare for ongoing growth and development which includes the completion of K Block for Pre-K and Kindergarten in 2019 and the commencement of L Block for Year One and Two students in  2020.

School governance
Rouse Hill Anglican College is owned by Sydney Anglican Schools Corporation, which is a body established by the Anglican Church Diocese of Sydney. Local policy is vested in a College Council which is appointed by the Corporation.

There are 19 schools currently owned by the Sydney Anglican Schools Corporation across the Sydney metropolitan area and on the South Coast extending to Milton (Ulladulla).

Day-to-day management including staffing, enrolments and educational programs are the responsibility of the Principal.

See also 
 List of non-government schools in New South Wales

References

External links
 Rouse Hill Anglican College official website
 Sydney Anglican Schools Corporation website
 

Anglican secondary schools in Sydney
Anglican primary schools in Sydney
Junior School Heads Association of Australia Member Schools
Rouse Hill, New South Wales
Anglican Diocese of Sydney
City of Blacktown